Sille, also known as Sille Subaşı, and formerly known as Sylata is a small Turkish village, near the town of Konya.

Sille Subaşı was one of the few villages where the Cappadocian Greek language was spoken until 1922. It was inhabited by Greeks who had been living there in peaceful coexistence with the nearby Turks of Konya for over 800 years.

The reason for this peaceful coexistence was Jalal al-Din Muhammad Rumi, who was the witness of a miracle that happened at the nearby Orthodox Christian monastery of Saint Chariton. In the Turkish language the monastery is now called Akmanastir and is translated as, "White Monastery". Jalal al-Din Rumi constructed a small mosque inside the Saint Chariton monastery. It is also notable that Jalal al-Din Rumi wrote Greek poems using the Arabic-Turkish scripting, while Greek Sille villagers wrote Turkish using the Greek alphabet scripting. This form of writing spread across the region and was commonly known as Karamanli Turkish writing.

Mevlana asked the Turks never to hurt the Greeks of the village, and assigned to the Greek villagers the task of cleaning his own tomb. The Turks respected his commandment. In turbulent times, several firmans from the Sultan were sent to Konya Turks, which reminded them of their promise not to hurt the Sille villagers. The coexistence of Sille Greeks with the nearby Turks remained peaceful, which is why the villagers managed to preserve for over eight centuries both their native Greek language and their Orthodox Christian religion.

In the population exchanges between Greece and Turkey (1923), Turkey and Greece expelled their respective Christian and Muslim populations to the other. After 1924, all Greeks had left the village. The majority of this population relocated to the Nea Silata village in Halkidiki, Greece.

Currently, the village is protected and renovation efforts were conducted for preservation and touristic purposes.

See also 
 Sille (dance)

References and notes

External links

 Sille Homepage
Sille in google maps
 Pictures of the village
 Catholic Encyclopedia entry

Towns in Turkey